Andy Frost may refer to:

 Andy Frost (radio personality) (born 1956), Toronto radio personality 
 Andy Frost (autosports) (born 1961), English-born automotive mechanic and drag racer 
 Andy Frost (rugby union) (born 1983), English rugby union player
 Andy Frost (hammer thrower), British athlete

See also
Andrew Frost (disambiguation)